Caracciolo is an Italian surname most associated with the noble House of Carácciolo from the Kingdom of Naples.

Other people with the name include:
Alberto Caracciolo, Argentinian musician
Andrea Caracciolo, Italian footballer
Battistello Caracciolo, Italian painter
Fabio Caracciolo, Belgian footballer of Italian descent
Francesco Caracciolo (1752-1799), Italian admiral and revolutionist
Franco Caracciolo, Italian conductor
Alessia Cara, Canadian musician
Pasqual or Pasquale Caracciolo, author of La gloria del cavallo Venice 1566 ("The Glory of the Horse")

Other uses 
In music
 Caracciolo is an opera by Franco Vittadini.
Ships
 Francesco Caracciolo-class battleship, an Italian dreadnought battleship class

Italian-language surnames